Lolly Moor is a   nature reserve  south of Dereham in Norfolk. It is managed by the Norfolk Wildlife Trust.

This site has wet grassland, scrub and alder carr. Flora include cowslip, lesser celandine, southern marsh orchid, marsh helleborine and twayblade.

There is access from Dereham Road.

References

Norfolk Wildlife Trust